Walter Polini (born 17 March 1955) is an Italian racing cyclist. He rode in the 1979 Tour de France.

References

External links
 

1955 births
Living people
Italian male cyclists
Place of birth missing (living people)
Cyclists from Bergamo